The Museum of Decorative Arts, at 17th and E streets in the Vedado district of Havana, Cuba is a decorative arts museum in the former residence of the María Luisa Gómez-Mena viuda de Cagiga, Countess of Revilla de Camargo, sister of José Gómez-Mena Vila, the owner of the Manzana de Gómez. It was designed in Paris by architects P. Virad and M. Destuque, inspired in French Renaissance and was built between 1924 and 1927 in a neo-classical style.

Address
Calle 17 #502, between E and D, Vedado, Havana, Cuba

References
 Cuba - Eyewitness Travel Guides (Dorling Kindersley Publishing, 2004) 
 Havana (Lonely Planet Publications,2001)

External links
Great Houses of Havana

Museum of Decorative Arts, Havana
Museums in Havana
History museums
Decorative arts museums
Art museums and galleries in Cuba
Art museums established in 1964
Museum of Decorative Arts, Havana
20th-century architecture in Cuba